Götschetal was a short-lived municipality in the district Saalekreis, in Saxony-Anhalt, Germany. It was created in July 2006 by the merger of the former municipalities Wallwitz, Gutenberg, Nehlitz, Sennewitz and Teicha. On 1 January 2010, it was absorbed into the municipality Petersberg.

References

Former municipalities in Saxony-Anhalt
Petersberg, Saxony-Anhalt